Jesús Álvaro García (born 1 December 1990) is a Spanish footballer who plays for Córdoba CF as a left back.

Club career
Born in Icod de los Vinos, Santa Cruz de Tenerife, Canary Islands, Álvaro was a product of local CD Tenerife's youth academy. He made his senior debut in the 2009–10 season, being relegated from the third division with the reserves.

On 4 June 2011, Álvaro played his first match with the main squad, a 0–1 away defeat against UD Las Palmas in which he featured the full 90 minutes for his only second level appearance of the campaign, ended in the same fashion. In June 2011, he was definitely promoted to the first team.

In January 2012, Álvaro was loaned to CD Leganés until 30 June. After being released by Tenerife he continued to compete in the third tier, representing CD Guadalajara, UD Las Palmas Atlético, FC Cartagena and Córdoba CF.

References

External links

1990 births
Living people
People from Icod de los Vinos
Sportspeople from the Province of Santa Cruz de Tenerife
Spanish footballers
Footballers from the Canary Islands
Association football defenders
Segunda División players
Segunda División B players
Tercera División players
CD Tenerife B players
CD Tenerife players
CD Leganés players
CD Guadalajara (Spain) footballers
UD Las Palmas Atlético players
FC Cartagena footballers
Córdoba CF players